Crematogaster bicolor is a species of ant in tribe Crematogastrini. It was described by Smith in 1860.

References

bicolor
Insects described in 1860